Transport between India and Bangladesh bears much historical and political significance for both countries, which possessed no ground transport links for 43 years, starting with the partition of Bengal and India in 1947. The Kolkata–Dhaka Bus (1999) and the Dhaka–Agartala Bus (2001) are the primary road links between the two countries; a direct Kolkata-Agartala running through Dhaka, the capital of Bangladesh is being developed by both countries. The Maitri Express (Friendship Express) was launched to revive a railway link between Kolkata and Dhaka that had been shut for 43 years.

Background

The partition of Bengal and India on 15 August 1947 led to the establishment of the Indian state of West Bengal; East Bengal became a province of the state of Pakistan. The hostile bilateral relations between the two nations made transport links very limited, despite the cultural and commercial links between West and East Bengal. At the outbreak of the Indo-Pakistani War of 1965, the only railway link between Dhaka and Kolkata was shut down, and not resumed until 2008 with the launch of the Maitreyi Express.

After the establishment of Bangladesh following the Bangladesh liberation war in 1971, bilateral relations improved considerably, but the two governments moved slowly on implementing a 1980 agreement on improving transport links. In the 1990s, the Indian and Bangladeshi governments collaborated to open bus services between Kolkata, the capital of West Bengal and one of the largest cities in India, and Dhaka, the capital and largest city of Bangladesh. In 2001, another bus service was launched to connect Dhaka with Agartala, the capital of the Indian state of Tripura the second largest city of Northeast India that borders Bangladesh in the east.

Bus services

Bangla Corridor
Since the 1980s, the Indian and Bangladeshi governments have sought to negotiate an agreement permitting commercial vehicles to pass through Bangladeshi highways to reach the northeastern states of India from the west; a concept described in India as the "Bangla Corridor." Such an arrangement is being promoted for its benefit to bilateral commerce, the transport cost reduction for Indian businesses and additional revenue for Bangladesh. In 2006, both governments began working on a proposal to provide a bus service directly connecting Kolkata with Agartala, the capital of the Indian state of Tripura, which borders eastern Bangladesh. As of 2007, travelling distance through Indian territory is an estimated , but a direct road link via Dhaka would shorten the travelling distance to an estimated , considerably reducing the costs of transport for Indian businesses, which have to transport goods and services through the narrow "Chicken's Neck" territory that is bordered by northern Bangladesh and southern Nepal. However, such an arrangement has been politically sensitive in Bangladesh.

On 2 June 2015, the first trial run of a direct bus between Kolkata and Agartala ran, a route distance of 500 km, as compared to the 1650 km if it ran through the Chicken's Neck to remain within India. This bus made an overnight stop in Dhaka. General service began on 7 June, and the first bus was flagged off by political leaders including Prime Minister of India Narendra Modi, Prime Minister of Bangladesh Sheikh Hasina, and Chief Minister of West Bengal Mamata Bannerjee.

Kolkata–Dhaka bus

The Govt. sponsored service between Kolkata and Dhaka was launched on 19 June 1999; the inaugural bus was received in Dhaka by Sheikh Hasina, Prime Minister of Bangladesh. The inauguration took place just months following the launch of the Delhi-Lahore Bus between Pakistan and India. Although receiving lesser media attention and fanfare, the bus service has expanded its services to meet higher demand. While boosting commerce between the two nations, the bus also enables people with families that were separated with the partition of India, to meet relatives and visit the land of their birth and heritage. The Kolkata-Dhaka bus service has remained uninterrupted, unlike the Delhi-Lahore bus that was suspended during the 2001-2002 India-Pakistan standoff.

The Kolkata-Dhaka Govt. bus is operated jointly by the West Bengal Surface Transport Corporation and the Bangladesh Road Transport Corporation (BRTC is the State Road Transport arm of the Bangladesh Govt.).  Buses starting from Dhaka leave on Monday, Wednesday, and Friday at 7:00 am and 7:30 am and buses starting from Kolkata are operated on Tuesday, Thursday and Saturday at 5:30 am, 8:30 am, and 12:30 pm, with no service from either side on Sunday. The journey is 12.5 hours long,  from India side and  into Bangladesh.

From India to Bangladesh there are services also provided by private comfortable a/c buslines (using Volvo and other luxurious Intercity bus transports) via the Haridaspur, North 24 Parganas / Benapole border post. Private Bangladeshi bus companies Shohagh, Green Line, Shyamoli and others operate daily bus services from Benapole to Dhaka. The normal one-way fare is Bangladeshi Taka 600–800, roughly $8–12.

Dhaka–Agartala bus
After years of negotiations, the Dhaka-Agartala bus was agreed upon on 11 July 2001 to connect Bangladesh with its eastern neighbour, the Indian state of Tripura, which has a substantial Bengali population and indigenous peoples who have close commercial and cultural links with the people of eastern Bangladesh.

Rail services

The complete rail links, including the historical links, between India & Bangladesh and their current status is as follows:

Maitree Express
The train covers a distance of 393 km, having a frequency of five days-a week.

Bandhan Express
In November 2017, a second passenger railway service between these two countries were established, connecting  with  via Petrapole–Benapole border, recreating the route of defunct Barisal Express.

Mitali Express
On 27 March 2021, on the occasion of 'Bangabandhu' Sheikh Mujibur Rahman's birth centenary and golden jubilee of Bangladesh's Independence, another passenger train named Mitali Express, the third passenger railway service between the two countries, was inaugurated by the Prime Minister Narendra Modi and Sheikh Hasina. The train bi-weekly train connects northern part of West Bengal to Dhaka and runs between New Jalpaiguri railway station and Dhaka Cantonment railway station via Haldibari–Chilahati border.

Further Connections

On 28 October 2017, Bangladesh Railway Minister Mujibal Haque said that India and Bangladesh are working on reconnecting railway lines in 12 places, which were cut off after partition of the country in 1947. India sponsored rail bridges on Titas and the Bhoirab rivers in Brahmanbaria district of his country were completed.

Aerial services

Bangladeshi airlines
 Biman Bangladesh Airlines, the national carrier of Bangladesh connects Dhaka and Chittagong with Kolkata and in 2019 it started operating flight from Dhaka to Delhi after a gap of 6 years.

 Other Private airline of Bangladesh like Regent Airways, US-Bangla Airlines connects both Dhaka and Chittagong with Kolkata, while Novoair only connects Dhaka to Kolkata. While US-Bangla Airlines also connects Dhaka with Chennai via Chittagong, becoming the first Bangladeshi airlines to operate flights to South India.

Indian airlines
 India's flag carrier Air India connects only Kolkata to Dhaka. While private airlines IndiGo connects Bangalore, Chennai, Delhi, Hyderabad and Kolkata with Dhaka.
SpiceJet connects Kolkata with Dhaka and Chittagong, while Delhi and Mumbai with Dhaka

Vistara connects Delhi with Dhaka.

 In 2019, SpiceJet started operating flights from Guwahati to Dhaka, but after a few months of operation, the airline ceased to operate due to not being commercially viable.

See also
 Bangladesh-India border

External links
 Map of India-Bangladesh border links
 Fox Parcel: Cargo to Bangladesh from India

References

Transport in India
Transport in Bangladesh
Bangladesh–India relations
International transport in Asia